Terror is a 1977 Danish crime film directed by Gert Fredholm and starring Bo Løvetand.

Cast
 Bo Løvetand - Boy
 Johnny Olsen - Trigger
 Ole Meyer - Schatz
 Jess Ingerslev - Benny
 Poul Reichhardt - Kriminalassistent Ancher
 Ole Ernst - Kriminalassistent Brask
 Ulf Pilgaard - Kriminalassistent Rieger
 Holger Juul Hansen - Kriminalkommisær Runge
 Knirke - Kate
 Ingolf David - Streichner
 Henning Palner - Direktør Ejlersen
 Lykke Nielsen - Direktør Ejlersens sekretær Jette
 Beatrice Palner - Schatz' mor
 Aksel Erhardtsen - Schatz' far
 Inger Stender - Schatz' fars sekretær
 Lise Thomsen - S-togspassager
 Lone Helmer - Cafeteriadame
 Ib Tardini - Cafeteriamedhjælper
 Ulla Jessen - Bennys fars veninde
 Ulla Koppel - Dame i pølsebod

External links

1977 films
1970s Danish-language films
1977 crime films
Films directed by Gert Fredholm
Danish crime films